Carposina bicincta is a moth of the family Carposinidae. It was first described by Lord Walsingham in 1907. It is endemic to the Hawaiian island of Molokai.

References

Carposinidae
Endemic moths of Hawaii